Glassey is a surname. Notable people with the surname include:

Alec Glassey (1887–1970), British Liberal politician
Betty Glassey, Papua New Guinea international lawn bowler
Bob Glassey (1916–1984), footballer
 Francis Patrick Glassey, performer
Thomas Glassey (1844–1936), Irish-born Australian politician